Josef 'Pepča' Stejskal (also known as Josef Lada Stejskal) is a figure of Brno subculture during the 1970s in Czechoslovakia. Labelled as a 'poet, artist, surrealist and protagonist', he was well known within the Brno 'counter culture' which opposed the communist regime at the time. Born (March 3, 1945) in the Moravian town of Kroměříž, he later moved to Brno as a young man full of ambitions.

In Brno, he established himself amongst the theatrical and literary circles of the time. Noted for his poetry and his artwork, he became best known for his theater posters which contained his unique brand of surrealism and humour. This unique style was popular with the people, but not with the communist regime, and it eventually landed him in 'hot water'; in 1978, he was forced to flee his motherland and ended up in far-away Sydney, Australia. This was good news for the theater scene in Australia as it was in long-awaited need of something new and edgy, and Pepča brought and planted his unique style there.

An image gallery of Josef Stejskal's best-known artworks can be found at the National Gallery of Australia.

References

Czech artists
Czech anti-communists
Czechoslovak emigrants to Australia
People from Kroměříž
Year of birth missing (living people)
Living people